Harvard House High School is a school located at 18, South Tangra Road, Kolkata, India. The school was established in 1995. This is a boys' school and is affiliated to Indian Certificate of Secondary Education and Indian School Certificate. This school apart from studies had opened its wing in the field of creativity, sports, social activities, etc. The school has attended and participated as well as hosted Inter-house and Inter-school competition.

The school motto is "Omnia Possibile Sunt", which means "All Things are Possible".

See also
Education in India
List of schools in India
Education in West Bengal

References

External links 

Boys' schools in India
High schools and secondary schools in Kolkata
Educational institutions established in 1995
1995 establishments in West Bengal